The Sagarmala Programme is an initiative by the Government of India to enhance the performance of the country's logistics sector. The programme envisages unlocking the potential of waterways and the coastline to minimize infrastructural investments required to meet these targets.

It entails investing  (2018) to set up new mega ports, modernizing India's existing ports, developing of 14 Coastal Economic Zones (CEZs) and Coastal Economic Units, enhancing port connectivity via road, rail, multi-modal logistics parks, pipelines & waterways and promoting coastal community development, with the aim of boosting merchandise exports by  billion and generating around 10 million direct and indirect jobs.

The Sagarmala Programme is the flagship programme of the Ministry of Ports, Shipping and Waterways to promote port-led development in the country by exploiting India's 7,517 km long coastline, 14,500 km of potentially navigable waterways and its strategic location on key international maritime trade routes. Sagarmala aims to modernize India's Ports, so that port-led development can be augmented and coastlines can be developed to contribute to India's growth. It also aims at "transforming the existing Ports into modern world-class Ports and integrate the development of the Ports, the Industrial clusters and hinterland and efficient evacuation systems through road, rail, inland and coastal waterways resulting in Ports becoming the drivers of economic activity in coastal areas."

Background
The Sagarmala Programme was originally mooted by the National Democratic Alliance government under Atal Bihari Vajpayee in 2003 as the maritime equivalent to the Golden Quadrilateral, another project under his government in the roads and highways sector. The Programme aimed to exploit India's vast coastlines and industrial waterways to drive industrial development. It was approved by the cabinet in March 2015.

The National Sagarmala Apex Committee (NSAC) is composed of the Minister of Shipping with Cabinet Ministers from stakeholder ministries and ministers in charge of ports in India's maritime states. The NSAC approved the overall National Perspective Plan (NPP) and regularly reviews the progress of implementation of these plans.

To assist in the implementation of Sagarmala projects, the Sagarmala Development Company Limited (SDCL) was incorporated on 31 August 2016, after receiving Cabinet approval on 20 July 2016, for providing funding support to project SPVs and projects in-line with Sagarmala objectives. Additionally, SDCL is also in the process of preparation of Detailed Project Report (DPRs) and feasibility studies for specific projects that could provide avenues for future equity investment by the company. The Sagarmala Development Company was incorporated after approval from the Indian Cabinet on 20 July 2016 with an initial authorized share capital of  crore and subscribed share capital of  crore, to give a push to port-led development. The present subscribed share capital of SDCL is  crore.

The Indian Port Rail & Ropeway Corporation Limited (IPRCL) was incorporated on 10 July 2015 to undertake the port-rail connectivity projects under Sagarmala Programme.

Sethusamudram Corporation Ltd is also a participant public sector enterprise in this project.

Inland & Coastal Shipping Ltd. (ICSL), SCI’s wholly owned subsidiary was incorporated in 2016 after Maritime India summit for undertaking/providing transport services through Inland waterways, coastal shipping and end to end logistics. ICSL and IWAI signed a historic Memorandum of Understanding on 22nd Jan’21 for operations and management of three IWAI cargo vessels i.e. MV Rabindranath Tagore, MV Lal Bahadur Shastri and MV Homi Bhabha. MV Rabindranath Tagore & MV Lal Bahadur Shastri  have been taken over by ICSL on 22nd Jan’21 and 26th Feb’21 respectively.

The Sagarmala National Perspective Plan was released by the Prime Minister on 14 April 2016 at the maiden Maritime India Summit 2016, with details on Project Plan and Implementation.

The scheme

Components
As per the approved implementation plan of Sagarmala scheme, these projects are to be taken up by the relevant Central Ministries/Agencies and State Governments preferably through private/PPP mode. The details are as below.

Progress

As of 31-Mar-2018, a total of 492 projects were under various stages of implementation, development and completion.

As of 2021, only 172 projects out of the 802 sanctioned have been completed and the remaining 632 projects are under the implementation stage. Of these, only 13 out of 98 road connectivity projects to ports have been completed and 28 out of 91 rail connectivity projects. 

Port-modernization under Sagarmala

Since about more than 90% of India's trade by volume is conducted via the country's maritime route, there is a continuous need to develop India's ports and trade-related infrastructure to accelerate growth in the manufacturing industry and to assist the 'Make in India' initiative. India has 12 major ports and approximately 200 non-major ports administered by Central and State Governments respectively.

As per the studies conducted under the Sagarmala Programme, it is expected that by 2025, cargo traffic at Indian ports will be approximately 2500 million tonnes per year while the current cargo handling capacity of Indian ports is only 1500 million tonnes per year. A roadmap has been prepared for increasing the Indian port capacity to over 3500 million tonnes per year by 2025 to cater to the growing traffic. This includes port operational efficiency improvement, capacity expansion of existing ports and new port development.

Under Project Unnati, the global benchmarks were adopted to improve the efficiency and productivity KPIs for 12 major ports. Around 116 initiatives were identified across 12 major ports to unlock more than 100 MTPA capacity just through efficiency improvement. Out of which, 86 initiatives have been implemented to unlock around 80 MTPA capacity.

Mega Ports

Six megaports are planned in Sagarmala project. 

There are also Private ports under construction/reopening

Port-linked industrialization under Sagarmala

Coastal Economic Zones (CEZ) and Coastal Economic Units (CEU)

Sectors targeted for manufacturing units are maritime and inland waterways, water transport, coastal and cruise shipping, and solar and wind energy generation, auto, telecom and IT, etc. Each CEZ will cover economic region consisting of several coastal districts with strong linkage to the ports in that region. Each CEZs will also create synergy with industrial corridors passing through the region, such as Delhi–Mumbai Industrial Corridor Project, Mumbai-Bangalore economic corridor, Dedicated Freight Corridor, Chennai Bangalore Industrial Corridor, Visakhapatnam–Chennai Industrial Corridor and Amritsar Delhi Kolkata Industrial Corridor, etc.

Each CEZ will have several Coastal Economic Units (CEU), and in turn each CEU will have several Port-Linked Industrial Clusters (PLIC). "Coastal Employment Units" (CEUs) serve as nodes within CEZ, each CEU industrial is an industrial estates with multiple industries. Each "Port-Linked Industrial Clusters" (PLIC) within  CEU will have several manufacturing units.

Benefits include national GDP growth with ease of doing business by boosting export by US$100 billion, 150,000 job creation by 2025, reduction in export cargo logistics cost and time, and increased global competitiveness of Indian exports.

List of CEZs proposed under the Sagarmala Programme 
Total 14 CEZs are planned to be developed in phases across coastal India. 
Kachch CEZ
Saurashtra CEZ
Suryapur CEZ
North Konkan CEZ
South Konkan CEZ
Dakshin Kanara CEZ
Malabar CEZ
Mannar CEZ
Poompuhar CEZ
VCIC South CEZ
VCIC Central CEZ
VCIC North CEZ
Kalinga CEZ
Gaud CEZ

Connectivity 
Of the 51,  port connectivity rail projects, 11 projects are already complete and rest are under execution.

List of Port-Linked Industrial Clusters (PLIC) 
Total 37 port-linked industrial clusters across several sectors: 
 Discrete Manufacturing Cluster, total 23:
Petrochemical Cluster, total 4:
 Power Cluster, total 4:
 Steel Cluster, total 2:
 Maritime Cluster, total 2:
 Cement Cluster, total 2:

Other initiatives for promoting port-linked industrialization under Sagarmala
In November 2017, with the development of first Special Economic Zone centered around the busiest cargo ports in India that handles 40% of India's export-import volume, Jawaharlal Nehru Port east of Mumbai, was initiated. Several large companies from telecom, auto and IT sectors are expected to bid for the 200 hectares of export-oriented manufacturing units in the SEZ to reduce export logistics cost, thus also generating direct jobs by infusing new technology, investment and world's best management practices.

Further, development of Smart Industrial Port City (SIPC) at Paradip and at Kandla ports and Coastal Employment Units (CEUs) at V.O. Chaidambarnar Port Trust and Kamarajar Port Limited is under progress.

Port-connectivity enhancement under Sagarmala

Under Sagarmala Programme, the endeavor is to provide enhanced connectivity between the ports and the domestic production/consumption centres. More than 210 connectivity projects have been identified. Some of the types of connectivity projects considered are listed below:

 Coastal Berths at various major and non-major ports
 National waterways prioritized for development in the first phase
 Heavy haul rail corridor from Talcher to Paradip
 Connectivity to Dedicated freight corridors
 Last mile rail and road connectivity projects
 Major rail connectivity projects
 Freight friendly Expressway projects connecting the major ports
 Development of Multi-Modal Logistics Parks
 POL Pipelines

Coastal community development under Sagarmala 

Fisheries

Sagarmala Programme in coordination with related Central Ministries and State Governments would fund capacity building, infrastructure, and social development projects related to value addition in fisheries, aquaculture and cold chain development. As part of the coastal community development component of the Sagarmala Programme, Ministry is part-funding fishing harbour projects in convergence with Department of Animal Husbandry and Dairying (DADF).

Coastal Tourism

For promoting tourism in maritime states under Sagarmala, projects have been identified in convergence with Ministry of Tourism and tourism development departments of maritime state governments. Key coastal tourism projects include:

 Development of Coastal Circuits under Swadesh Darshan Scheme of Ministry of Tourism
 Development of infrastructure for promoting Cruise tourism
 Development of lighthouses
 National Maritime Heritage Museum Complex at Lothal
 Underwater viewing gallery and restaurant at Beyt Dwarka

See also 

 Bharatmala
 Diamond Quadrilateral, Subsumed in Bharatmala
 Golden Quadrilateral, completed national road development connectivity older scheme
 Expressways of India
 Setu Bharatam, river road bridge development in India
 Transport in India
 Multi-Modal Logistics Parks in India
 Rail transport in India
 UDAN, national aviation development scheme
 Water transport in India
 Indian Rivers Inter-link
 List of National Waterways in India
 RORO ferries in India

References

Modi administration initiatives
Proposed transport infrastructure in India
Ministry of Ports, Shipping and Waterways (India)